Mark Henry Gitenstein (born March 7, 1947) is an American lawyer and diplomat who is serving as the United States ambassador to the European Union since 2022. He was nominated by President Joe Biden on July 27, 2021, and confirmed by the United States Senate on December 18, 2021. He formerly served as the United States ambassador to Romania from 2009 to 2012; he was nominated by President Barack Obama on June 11, 2009 and confirmed by the Senate on July 8, 2009.

Early life and education
Gitenstein is of Romanian Jewish heritage, as his grandparents were immigrants from Botoșani, Romania in the late-19th century. He attended the Indian Springs School, graduating in 1964. He earned a Bachelor of Arts degree from Duke University and a Juris Doctor from the Georgetown Law School.

Career
Gitenstein served as chief counsel (1987–1989) and minority chief counsel (1981–1987) to the United States Senate Committee on the Judiciary, serving under then-Senator Joe Biden. Gitenstein also served as counsel to the United States Senate Select Committee on Intelligence (1975–1978).

He became a partner at Mayer Brown in 1989 and was a "nonresident senior fellow" at the Brookings Institution. He is the author of Matters of Principle, a non-fiction book about the Robert Bork Supreme Court nomination, for which he was awarded the American Bar Association's Silver Gavel award. He has been selected by his peers several times for inclusion in "Best Lawyers in America".

He was also on the advisory board for President-elect Barack Obama's presidential transition team.  He was named as a leading choice to lead the Office of Legal Policy in the Department of Justice. but was rejected after public reports of his extensive work as a registered lobbyist for the US Chamber of Commerce.

Ambassador to Romania
In 2009 Gitenstein was nominated for the post of U.S. Ambassador to Romania. The Romanian English-language news daily Nine O'Clock selected Ambassador Gitenstein as "The Foreign Diplomat of the Year for 2011."  Gitenstein worked to strengthen relations with Romania on a variety of issues, focusing on fighting corruption, improving transparency, and strengthening the rule of law. He actively promoted deeper development of Romania's equity markets, as well as a fair and transparent business environment for all investors. He also encouraged greater private sector involvement in state-owned enterprises (SOEs), including the introduction of a corporate governance code for SOEs. As a means of promoting social change, Gitenstein worked with TechSoup Romania to establish Restart Romania, a project designed to demonstrate the power of the internet and social media to find solutions to social justice problems, support transparency of public institutions, and promote grass roots efforts to fight corruption. The U.S.–Romanian Ballistic Missile Defense Agreement was signed and negotiated during Gitenstein's tenure in Bucharest. Gitenstein travelled to Afghanistan three times to visit U.S. and Romanian troops. He was a human rights advocate for the country's minority Roma population. He was awarded the Star of Romania, the country's highest civilian honor, in 2012.

Biden administration 

On September 5, 2020, Gitenstein was announced to be a member of the advisory council of the Biden-Harris Transition Team.

Ambassador to the EU
On July 27, 2021, President Joe Biden announced the nomination of Gitenstein to be the United States ambassador to the European Union. His nomination was sent to the Senate the following day. On September 28, 2021, a hearing on his nomination was held before the Senate Foreign Relations Committee. On October 19, 2021, his nomination was reported favorably out of committee. The United States Senate confirmed him on December 18, 2021 by voice vote. Gitenstein presented his credentials to the European Commission president Ursula von der Leyen on January 24, 2022.

Personal life 
He is married to Elizabeth (Libby) Gitenstein and has three children and five grandchildren.

Honors
  Romanian Royal Family: 53rd Knight of the Royal Decoration of the Cross of the Romanian Royal House

See also

References

External links

 

|-

1946 births
Ambassadors of the United States to the European Union
Ambassadors of the United States to Romania
American people of Romanian-Jewish descent
Duke University alumni
Living people
People from Florala, Alabama